The Tŭkchang Line is an electrified railway line of the Korean State Railway in South P'yŏngan Province, North Korea, running from Pukch'ang on the P'yŏngdŏk Line to Sŏksan.

History
The line was opened in 1961 to assist with the construction of the Pukch'ang Thermal Power Complex which began in that year.

Services

The important Pukch'ang Thermal Power Complex - the largest coal-fired power plant in the DPRK -  is located on this line at Yangch'on, receiving a great deal of coal from the mines in the area.

Route 

A yellow background in the "Distance" box indicates that section of the line is not electrified.

References

Railway lines in North Korea
Standard gauge railways in North Korea